The 1921–22 season was Galatasaray SK's 18th in existence and the club's 12th consecutive season in the Istanbul Football League.

Squad statistics

Competitions

İstanbul Football League

Standings

Matches

Friendly Matches

Galatasaray Cup
Galatasaray won the cup.

References

External links
 Galatasaray Sports Club Official Website 
 Turkish Football Federation - Galatasaray A.Ş. 
 uefa.com - Galatasaray AŞ

Galatasaray S.K. (football) seasons
Association football clubs 1921–22 season
1920s in Istanbul
Galatasaray Sports Club 1921–22 season
1921 in Turkish sport
1922 in Turkish sport